Léolia Jeanjean (born 14 August 1995) is a French tennis player.

Jeanjean has a career-high singles ranking of world No. 107 by the Women's Tennis Association (WTA), achieved on 28 November 2022. She also has a career-high WTA doubles ranking of 248, reached in April 2022.

Early life
Jeanjean was a gifted juniors player, but suffered a serious knee injury at age 14.

In 2008, Jeanjean was a quarterfinalist in Les Petits As and reached the final of the French U14 Championship. A league coach is then sent eleven weeks a year to La Grande-Motte where she lives.

In 2009, she received a wildcard at Roland Garros for the junior singles and another for the junior doubles with her partner Darja Salnikova, but she was eliminated in the first round each time. She was invited again in 2010, but did not do better in singles, while in doubles with Clothilde de Bernardi, she reached the quarterfinals.

College career
Jeanjean attended Baylor University (Bachelor in Sociology) and played college tennis at the University of Arkansas (Bachelor in Criminal justice) as well as Lynn University, where she graduated with an MBA in Finance in 2019.

Professional career

2022: Grand Slam debut and third round, top 150
Jeanjean made her Grand Slam main-draw debut at the 2022 French Open, after receiving a wildcard for the singles tournament. She recorded her first Grand Slam win against world No. 45, Nuria Párrizas Díaz, in the first round; she then defeated eighth-seed and former world No. 1, Karolína Plíšková, 6-2, 6-2 in the second round, her first ever victory over a player ranked in the top-10 and second in the top-50. Ranked No. 227, she became the third-lowest ranked player to defeat a top-ten opponent in the season, following No. 409 Daria Saville's upset of Ons Jabeur in Indian Wells and No. 231 Laura Siegemund's win (via retirement) over Maria Sakkari in Stuttgart. She was also the lowest-ranked female player to win a match at Roland Garros against a top-ten opponent since Conchita Martinez defeated Lori McNeil in 1988. As a result, she reached the top 150 for the first time in her career, climbing up nearly 80 positions.

2023: Australian Open debut
On her debut at the Australian Open, she entered the first major of the year as a lucky loser.

Performance timeline

Only main-draw results in WTA Tour, Grand Slam tournaments, Fed Cup/Billie Jean King Cup and Olympic Games are included in win–loss records.

Singles
Current after the 2023 Monterrey Open.

WTA Challenger finals

Singles: 1 (1 runner-up)

ITF finals

Singles: 5 (2 titles, 3 runner–ups)

Doubles: 7 (2 titles, 5 runner–ups)

Top 10 wins

Notes

References

External links

1995 births
Living people
French female tennis players
Sportspeople from Montpellier
Lynn Fighting Knights women's tennis players